Roman Görtz (born 11 January 1974 in Berlin) is a retired German footballer.

Görtz made a total of three appearances in the 2. Bundesliga for Tennis Borussia Berlin.

References

External links 
 

1974 births
Living people
Footballers from Berlin
German footballers
Association football goalkeepers
2. Bundesliga players
Füchse Berlin Reinickendorf players
Tennis Borussia Berlin players
FC Carl Zeiss Jena players
Berliner AK 07 players
SV Yeşilyurt players
BFC Preussen players
Hertha Zehlendorf players